Denis Ruddy (born 3 April 1950) was a Scottish footballer who played for Clydebank, Dumbarton and Stenhousemuir.

References

1950 births
Scottish footballers
Dumbarton F.C. players
Clydebank F.C. (1965) players
Stenhousemuir F.C. players
Scottish Football League players
Living people
Place of birth missing (living people)
Association football midfielders